Odites crocota is a moth in the family Depressariidae. It was described by Edward Meyrick in 1912. It is found in South Africa.

The wingspan is about 21 mm. The forewings are whitish yellowish with the second discal stigma blackish. The hindwings are whitish.

References

Endemic moths of South Africa
Moths described in 1912
Odites
Taxa named by Edward Meyrick